The 2017 Neva Cup was a professional tennis tournament played on indoor hard courts. It was the sixth edition of the tournament and was part of the 2017 ITF Women's Circuit. It took place in Saint Petersburg, Russia, on 18–24 September 2017.

Singles main draw entrants

Seeds 

 1 Rankings as of 11 September 2017.

Other entrants 
The following players received a wildcard into the singles main draw:
  Gozal Ainitdinova
  Margarita Lazareva
  Polina Leykina
  Valeriya Strakhova

The following players received entry using protected rankings:
  Ysaline Bonaventure
  Vitalia Diatchenko

The following players received entry from the qualifying draw:
  Anastasia Gasanova
  Vivian Heisen
  Sofya Lansere
  Elena Rybakina

Champions

Singles

 Belinda Bencic def.  Dayana Yastremska, 6–2, 6–3

Doubles
 
 Anna Blinkova /  Veronika Kudermetova def.  Belinda Bencic /  Michaela Hončová, 6–3, 6–1

External links 
 2017 Neva Cup at ITFtennis.com
 Official website

2017 ITF Women's Circuit
2017 in Russian tennis
Tennis tournaments in Russia